Time After Time is a studio album by the American singer Eva Cassidy, released in 2000, four years after her death in 1996.

Critical reception
The Washington Post wrote that "the songs have been lovingly, painstakingly digitized and sequenced so as to create a coherent album of tender, touching acoustic folk and minimally orchestrated pop that spotlights Cassidy's talent."

Arun Starkey, writing for Far Out, opined Cassidy's version of "Kathy's Song" could make a "strong claim to be better than the original."

Track listing
"Kathy's Song" (Paul Simon) – 2:47
"Ain't No Sunshine" (Bill Withers) – 3:26
"The Letter" (Wayne Carson Thompson) – 4:15
"At Last" (Mack Gordon, Harry Warren) – 2:58
"Time After Time" (Rob Hyman, Cyndi Lauper) – 4:00
"Penny to My Name" (Roger Henderson) – 3:41
"I Wandered By a Brookside" (music: Barbara Berry; words: Traditional from the Alfred Williams Collection, Swindon Library) – 3:31
"I Wish I Was a Single Girl Again" (Harlan Howard) – 2:29
"Easy Street Dream" (Steven Digman) – 3:20
"Anniversary Song" (Digman) – 2:54
"Woodstock" (Joni Mitchell) – 4:21
"Way Beyond the Blue" (Traditional) – 2:26

Personnel
Eva Cassidy - vocals, acoustic and electric guitars
Chris Biondo - bass guitar
Raice McLeod - drums
Lenny Williams - piano
Roger Henderson - acoustic guitar

Production
Producers: Chris Biondo, Bill Straw, Lenny Williams
Engineer: Chris Biondo
Mixing: Chris Biondo, Geoff Gillette, Eric Lemley
Mastering: Robert Vosgien
Design: Eileen White
Paintings: Eva Cassidy
Photography: Larry Melton
Liner notes: Keith Grimes, Kevin Howlett

Charts

References

Eva Cassidy albums
2000 albums